The 2005–06 Irish League Cup (known as the CIS Insurance Cup for sponsorship reasons) was the 20th edition of Northern Ireland's secondary football knock-out cup competition. It concluded on 10 December 2005 with the final.

Glentoran were the defending champions after their fifth League Cup win last season; a 2–1 victory over Linfield in the previous final. This season both clubs reached the final again but this time Linfield came out on top by defeating the Glens 3–0 to lift the cup for the eighth time, with Glenn Ferguson scoring a Hat-trick. This was the seventh, and to date, last time that both clubs met in the final.

The 16 clubs taking part were divided into four groups of four clubs. The clubs in each group played each other at home and away. The top two clubs from each group then advanced to the quarter-finals where they played a single knock-out tie against another quarter-finalist. The semi-finals were played in the same format with the two winners of the ties advancing to the single match final.

Group stage

Group A

Group B

Group C

Group D

Quarter-finals

Semi-finals

Final

References

Lea
2005–06 domestic association football cups
2005-06